Wayne Harris (born c. 1948) is a retired  Canadian jockey in Thoroughbred horse racing who competed in Canada and the United States and who is best known for winning Canada's most prestigious race, the 1968 Queen's Plate.

A top jockey at Woodbine Racetrack and Greenwood Raceway in Toronto, in 1967 Harris relocated to race at tracks in California. At age twenty, he returned to Woodine for the 1968 running of the Queen's Plate where he rode Merger for Western Canadian businessmen, Max Bell and Frank McMahon.

Harris won a number of Graded stakes races in the United States and notably rode William H. Perry's  U.S. Racing Hall of Fame filly Gamely to victory in the 1968 Vanity Handicap and the 1969 Santa Monica Handicap.

References
Cauz, Louis E. The Plate. (1984) Deneau Publishers 
 Ocala Star-Banner - June 9, 1968 article on Wayne Harris riding Gamely
 Los Angeles Times - June 30, 1968 article on Wayne Harris winning the Vanity Handicap

Living people
Canadian jockeys
Sportspeople from Vancouver
Year of birth missing (living people)